An insectoid is an insect-like or arachnid-like creature.

Insectoid may refer to:

 Insectoid robot
 Insectoids in science fiction